Dejan Radosavljević (Serbian Cyrillic: Дејан Радосављевић; born 5 May 1979) is a Serbian former football midfielder.

He has previously played with FK Jedinstvo Donja Mutnica, FK Jedinstvo Paraćin, FK Jagodina, FK Sevojno, FK Novi Pazar, FK Radnički Niš, FK Napredak Kruševac, FK Sloga Kraljevo and FK Borac Čačak.

References

1979 births
Living people
Sportspeople from Kraljevo
Serbian footballers
FK Jagodina players
Serbian First League players
Serbian SuperLiga players
FK Sevojno players
FK Novi Pazar players
FK Radnički Niš players
FK Napredak Kruševac players
FK Sloga Kraljevo players
FK Borac Čačak players
OFK Radnički Kovači players
Association football midfielders